Youthful Spirit is a Gospel music Choir from Churchill Community School, North Somerset, England. It consists of a rotating cast of students at the school from Year 8 to Year 13. The only entry requirement is "Students with a passion for music". It was born by Churchill Music! with the support of Alison Cooper and all the other music staff, and has since become an international gospel choir.

About
Founded in 1998 by Alison Cooper, Head of Music at the school, Youthful Spirit has a wide repertoire ranging from Swahili and A cappella to the likes of Stevie Wonder, Cyndi Lauper and other pop influenced songs. The choir create CDs of their work: "... You Caught Me In the Groove", 2000, "Sweet Rhythms", 2003, "Song of the Sunrise", 2006, "Blessed", 2008,"Glorious", 2009 and most recently, "Let The Sun Shine", 2013. The CDs were originally recorded in Weston College and Worle Community School until the 2006 "Song of the Sunrise" which was recorded in the school with the construction of the new Performing Arts building and Recording Studio. "Song of the Sunrise" was recorded at the school and the local St John the Baptist Church. The choir go on European Tours, generally to mark the release of a new CD such as the "Song of the Sunrise Tour" in 2006 and the "Blessed Tour" in 2008.

From September 2009, the setup of the choir is set to change. Musical Director Alison Cooper wants the choir to have more say in the choirs repertoire and split the mass choir into smaller groups for rehearsal purposes. It was announced on Friday September 11 that a new CD was to be made by the end of the year. The CD is to be called "Glorious" and will include songs such as Whitney Houston's I Go To The Rock and Edwin Hawkins' I Heard The Voice.

In 2011, the choir were asked to perform at St Georges, Bristol once again. For a new year, and a new feel to the choir, they branched into more popular music, including Take That's Rule the World and Labrinth's Let the Sun Shine, which proved to be extremely popular. This new, revamped repertoire was taken on tour to Austria in July 2011 and again in July 2013.

Tour
The choir go on tour to various destinations in Europe, generally to mark the release of a new CD. As of 2008, they have been to Athens, Greece; Hildesheim, Germany; Carinthia, Austria; and Venice, Italy. They have also performed at the Royal Albert Hall, London.
Some of the venues at which the choir have performed include Terra Mystica, Austria (a venue inside a mountain), The Playhouse, Weston-super-Mare and St Nicholas Cathedral, Prague. They have also performed at Wells Cathedral, Somerset for the 5 Bishops attending the Lambeth Conference in 2008 and St George's Church, Brandon Hill, Bristol in a Gospel evening in March 2009.

By the end of 2008, it was looking unlikely that a tour in 2009 would happen, due to the economic climate. However, ultimately the tour went ahead travelling by coach to "keep costs down", visiting Carinthia, Austria once again in venues in Murau, Lake Ossiach, and Feistritz im Rosental. The tour was a huge success with nearly every concert a sell-out.

The 2010 tour went to Hildesheim in Germany. It's been the second time that the choir performed there.
The concerts took place on the historic market square.
A trip to Berlin with a visit in the Bundestag and a performance in the St. Mathilde Church in Laatzen was included.

Youthful Spirit have toured Carinthia, Austria, twice more since the 2009 tour, in July 2011 and again in July 2013, this time in support of the "Let The Sun Shine" CD.

Discography

English choirs
British gospel music groups
Musical groups established in 1998